Vulmont is a commune in the Moselle department in Grand Est in north-eastern France.

Population
Since 2012 Vulmont's population has been in steady decline, dropping from 42 to 30.

See also
 Communes of the Moselle department

References

External links
 

Communes of Moselle (department)